The 1974–75 Southern Hockey League season was the second season of the Southern Hockey League. On July 31, 1975, Jack Riley was announced as the new commissioner of the SHL, taking over for interim leader Gene Hawthorne, of the Roanoke Valley Rebels. The four existing teams returned from the previous season, joined by a fifth expansion team from Fayetteville, North Carolina. The new team was named after the Fayetteville Arsenal, and was scheduled to play at the Cumberland County Memorial Arena. In October 1974, owner Bill Raue moved the team, to Hampton, Virginia before playing any games, when availability of home ice dates became a problem. The new Hampton Gulls moved into the Hampton Coliseum recently vacated by the Virginia Wings of the American Hockey League. The five teams played a complete schedule of 72 games, with the Charlotte Checkers winning the regular season, and the playoffs.

Standings
Final standings of the regular season.

WHA/NHL affiliations
Southern Hockey League franchises were primarily affiliated with World Hockey Association teams, however some also had agreements with National Hockey League teams. Summary of WHA/NHL affiliation agreements:

Scoring leaders
Top 10 SHL points scoring leaders.

Playoffs 
James Crockett Cup playoffs.

References

Southern
Southern Hockey League (1973–1977)